A Yank in Australia is a 1942 Australian comedy film directed by Alfred J. Goulding and starring Al Thomas and Hartney Arthur.

Plot
Two journalists in New York, American Headlines Haggerty (Al Thomas) and Englishman Clarence Worthington (Hartney Arthur) are sent to cover the war in the South Pacific. They get marooned on the Australian coast along with two rival female reporters after a Japanese sub sinks their boat. They are rescued by a girl who lives on the island with her father, Horace. Together they all uncover and stop a plot by the Japanese to invade Australia.

Cast
Al Thomas as Headlines Haggerty
Hartney Arthur as Clarence Worthington
Kitty Bluett as Clara Matthews
Jane Conolly as Dolly
Graham Wicker as Horace
Alfred J. Goulding as a Japanese spy
Joy Nichols
Frank Bradley
Marie La Varre

Production
The film was shot in 1942 at the Commonwealth Film Laboratory studios in Sydney, with exteriors at Taronga Park Zoo. Several of the cast were established radio performers.

Release
The film took two years to be released, making its world debut in Brisbane on 11 November 1944. A local critic called it "an example of just how bad a motion picture can be...  In every department – production, dialogue, story – A Yank in Australia falls short. Incoherence, incredibility, and inconsistency are spread like treacle over the whole thing."

Box office receipts were poor but the film was also released in England and the US.

References

External links
A Yank in Australia in the Internet Movie Database
A Yank in Australia at National Film and Sound Archive
A Yank in Australia at Oz Movies

1942 films
Australian comedy-drama films
1942 comedy-drama films
American comedy-drama films
American black-and-white films
1940s American films
1940s Australian films
1940s English-language films